Martin Emmrich (born 17 December 1984) is a German retired professional tennis player who specialized in doubles, participating primarily in the ATP World Tour. On 12 October 2009, he reached his highest ATP singles ranking of 604 whilst his highest doubles ranking of No. 35 was achieved on 5 August 2013.

Personal life
He is the son of Thomas Emmrich, a former German tennis player who played for the East Germany and the only one from that country to ever hold an ATP ranking.
Martin married Dutch player Michaëlla Krajicek in July 2015. They separated in 2018.

ATP career finals

Doubles: 7 (3 titles, 4 runner-ups)

Challenger career finals

Doubles: 23 (15–8)

Grand Slam doubles performance timeline

See also
 Thomas Emmrich

References

External links
 
 
 

1984 births
Living people
German male tennis players
Sportspeople from Magdeburg